Kingvale is a census-designated place (CDP) in Placer County and Nevada County, California, United States. The CDP straddles the border of the two counties, with Nevada County to the north and Placer County to the south. Kingvale was listed on an official map as of 1955. The population was 143 at the 2010 census.

Geography
According to the United States Census Bureau, the CDP covers an area of 1.0 square miles (2.5 km), 99.12% of it land, and 0.88% of it water.

Demographics

At the 2010 census Kingvale had a population of 143. The racial makeup of Kingvale was 135 (94.4%) White, 1 (0.7%) African American, 1 (0.7%) Native American, 0 (0.0%) Asian, 1 (0.7%) Pacific Islander, 2 (1.4%) from other races, and 3 (2.1%) from two or more races. Hispanic or Latino of any race were 6 people (4.2%).

The whole population lived in households, no one lived in non-institutionalized group quarters and no one was institutionalized.

There were 69 households, 11 (15.9%) had children under the age of 18 living in them, 31 (44.9%) were opposite-sex married couples living together, 2 (2.9%) had a female householder with no husband present, 5 (7.2%) had a male householder with no wife present.  There were 11 (15.9%) unmarried opposite-sex partnerships, and 2 (2.9%) same-sex married couples or partnerships. 22 households (31.9%) were one person and 5 (7.2%) had someone living alone who was 65 or older. The average household size was 2.07.  There were 38 families (55.1% of households); the average family size was 2.37.

The age distribution was 19 people (13.3%) under the age of 18, 4 people (2.8%) aged 18 to 24, 43 people (30.1%) aged 25 to 44, 63 people (44.1%) aged 45 to 64, and 14 people (9.8%) who were 65 or older.  The median age was 46.9 years. For every 100 females, there were 127.0 males.  For every 100 females age 18 and over, there were 134.0 males.

There were 340 housing units at an average density of 350.5 per square mile, of the occupied units 57 (82.6%) were owner-occupied and 12 (17.4%) were rented. The homeowner vacancy rate was 9.5%; the rental vacancy rate was 0%.  115 people (80.4% of the population) lived in owner-occupied housing units and 28 people (19.6%) lived in rental housing units.

As of the 2010 U.S. Census, 143 people resided in the CDP with 2 living on the Placer County side and 141 residing on the Nevada County side. Breaking the Hispanic and Latino population out, the racial makeup of the Placer County side of the CDP was 2 (100%) White. None of the population was Hispanic or Latino.  The racial makeup of the Nevada County side was 138 (97.9%) White, 1 (0.7%) African American, 1 (0.7%) Pacific Islander, and 3 (2.1%) were of two or more races. 6 persons (4.3%) were Hispanic or Latino of any race.

Notes

References 

 U.S. Census Bureau. American Community Survey, 2011 American Community Survey 5-Year Estimates. U.S. Census website. Retrieved 2013-10-21.

Census-designated places in Placer County, California
Census-designated places in Nevada County, California
Census-designated places in California